Karolik is a given name and surname. As a given name, it is an alternate form of Charles. Notable people with the surname include:

Dzyanis Karolik (born 1979), Belarusian footballer
Martha Codman Karolik (1858–1948), American philanthropist and art collector
Maxim Karolik (1893–1963), American opera singer

See also

Lyudmila Korolik (born 1975), Belarusian cross-country skier

Notes